Bathochordaeus is a genus of larvacean tunicates in the family Oikopleuridae.

References 

 van der Land, J. (2001). Appendicularia, in: Costello, M.J. et al. (Ed.) (2001). European register of marine species: a check-list of the marine species in Europe and a bibliography of guides to their identification. Collection Patrimoines Naturels, 50: pp. 356  
 Fenaux, R., Q. Bone, and D. Deibel. 1998. Appendicularian distribution and zoogeography, p. 251-264. In q. Bone [ed.], The biology of pelagic tunicates. Oxford University Press

External links 

 Bathochordaeus at WoRMS
 Youtube video of living animal
 Sherlock, R.E., Walz, K.R., Schlining, K.L. et al.: Morphology, ecology, and molecular biology of a new species of giant larvacean in the eastern North Pacific: Bathochordaeus mcnutti sp. nov.; in: Mar Biol 164, 20 (2017); doi:10.1007/s00227-016-3046-0

Appendicularia
Tunicate genera